Dropping Lick Creek is a stream in the U.S. state of West Virginia.

Dropping Lick Creek most likely was so named on account of a mineral lick near a waterfall.

See also
List of rivers of West Virginia

References

Rivers of Monroe County, West Virginia
Rivers of West Virginia